State Route 15 (SR 15) is a north–south and east–west route in northwestern Ohio. Its southern (eastern) terminus is at its interchange with U.S. Route 23/State Route 103 (US 23/SR 103) near Carey, and its northern (western) terminus is at the Michigan state line north of Pioneer, where the route continues in Michigan as M-99. The route is signed east–west from Carey to Bryan, and it is signed north–south from there to the Michigan state line.

SR 15 is an expressway for its southernmost :  where it runs concurrently with Interstate 75 (I-75),  where it runs concurrently with US 68, and the final  as a stand-alone limited-access road until its junction with US 23. The final  are part of a heavily traveled corridor providing the most direct route between Detroit, Toledo, Findlay, Marion and Columbus.

History

SR 15 was certified in 1923, along the current US 322, which replaced it in 1926.

In 1926 the designation was reapplied to a route from Carey to the Indiana state line. In 1929 it was rerouted to Bryan, replacing parts of SR 9. It replaced the rest of SR 9 in 1931, rerouted along its current route to the Michigan state line.

In 1966, SR 15 was rerouted on an expressway from I-75 in Findlay to US 23 in Carey, its new southern (eastern) terminus. The highway runs a few miles south of its previous routing, which was recertified as SR 568 the same year.

Major intersections

References

External links

015
Transportation in Wyandot County, Ohio
Transportation in Hancock County, Ohio
Transportation in Putnam County, Ohio
Transportation in Defiance County, Ohio
Transportation in Williams County, Ohio